The Mendocino Redwood Company (or MRC), is a California based forest products company, which operates one mill in Ukiah, with holdings of over , primarily in Mendocino County.

Background
This relatively new timber company owns and manages ten percent of the county's private land. Founded in 1998, the Fisher Family, founders of Gap Clothing, are the majority stake owners.

Mendocino Redwood Company utilizes herbicide applications to reduce tanoak density and restore conifer forests. The application and quantity of use is regulated by the Mendocino Agricultural Commission. California is the second largest forestland state in the United States, second to Alaska. Mendocino County has one of the largest percentages of the state's overall forest land.

Growth
Following a July 29, 2008 "Final Order" from the US Bankruptcy Judge Richard Schmidt, the way cleared for MRC to take control of the once storied, then vilified, and, finally, bankrupt Pacific Lumber Company in Humboldt County, California from Maxxam Inc. of Texas. The company town of Scotia and other properties were transferred to Marathon Structured Finance.

Humboldt
The consolidation of Pacific Lumber Company (PALCO) and subsidiaries is under the new name of Humboldt Redwood Company, which began operations ostensibly with a more conservative harvesting model that eliminates clearcutting and most old-growth redwood cutting.

Certification
Mendocino Redwood Company was given a well managed certification of timber management practices. This certification was issued by the Forest Stewardship Council. The certification study was conducted by Scientific Certification Systems.

References

External links
 Official company website

Forest products companies of the United States
Companies based in Mendocino County, California
American companies established in 1998
1998 establishments in California